Ichthyophis biangularis, the angular caecilian or Metang caecilian, is a species of amphibian in the family Ichthyophiidae endemic to Borneo (Malaysia): it is only known from its type locality, Mount Matang in Sarawak, where the holotype was collected in 1872 by Alfred Hart Everett. New specimens were collected from the type locality only in 2009. In addition, one larval sample was collected from the same region and identified as likely Ichthyophis biangularis using genetic methods.

Description
The eye is dimly distinct, with a slightly lighter ring about it.

Habitat
This is a little known species. It is presumed to inhabit tropical moist forests.

References

biangularis
Amphibians described in 1965
Amphibians of Malaysia
Endemic fauna of Malaysia
Endemic fauna of Borneo
Taxonomy articles created by Polbot
Amphibians of Borneo